Today We're Believers is an album by Royal Canoe, released in 2013.

Critical reception
PopMatters wrote that "while [the album's] scattershot approach might be appealing on the surface, at 12 songs – four of them eclipsing the five-minute mark – the record does feel a bit overlong." Now called the album "a smorgasbord of sound that’s all bongos, keyboards and languorous breakdowns that creep into repetitive territory."

Track listing
"Today We're Believers" – 4:23
"Hold on to the Metal" – 3:54
"Just Enough" – 5:44
"Exodus of the Year" – 3:51
"Bathtubs" – 5:51
"Button Fumbla" – 4:53
"Show Me Your Eyes" – 3:16
"Birthday" – 3:44
"Nightcrawlin" – 5:44
"Stemming" – 4:40
"Light" – 2:59
"If I Had A House" – 6:27

Personnel
Matt Peters – vocals, keyboard, acoustic guitar
Bucky Driedger – vocals, electric guitar
Matt Schellenberg – vocals, keyboard
Brendan Berg – vocals, bass guitar, keyboard
Derek Allard – drums
Michael Jordan – electronic drums
Dan Ardies – baritone sax on "Show Me Your Eyes"
John Paul Peters – percussion on "Just Enough", engineering, mixing
Joao Carvalho – mastering

References

2013 albums
Royal Canoe albums